, born Wang Cenjing, is a Chinese-born Japanese basketball player. She became a naturalized Japanese citizen in 2013 and represented Japan in the basketball competition at the 2016 Summer Olympics.

References

Japanese women's basketball players
Basketball players at the 2016 Summer Olympics
Olympic basketball players of Japan
1987 births
Living people
Centers (basketball)
Basketball players from Tianjin
Chinese emigrants to Japan
Chinese expatriate basketball people in Japan
Chinese women's basketball players
Naturalized citizens of Japan
Japanese sportspeople of Chinese descent